Rhinella limensis is a species of toad in the family Bufonidae.
It is endemic to Peru.
Its natural habitats are rivers, hot deserts, sandy shores, arable land, and rural gardens.

References

limensis
Amphibians of Peru
Amphibians of the Andes
Amphibians described in 1901
Taxonomy articles created by Polbot